Pedro Manuel Tavares de Almeida (born 11 December 1993) is a Brazilian Olympic dressage rider. He participated at his home Olympics in Rio de Janeiro in 2016, where he placed 10th in the team and 53rd in the individual competition.

He also competed at the 2014 World Equestrian Games in Normandy, France, where he finished 24th with the Brazilian team in the team competition and 91st in the individual dressage competition.

His twin brother Manuel and sister Luiza have also been competing internationally for Brazil in dressage.

References

1993 births
Living people
Brazilian male equestrians
Brazilian dressage riders
Place of birth missing (living people)
Equestrians at the 2016 Summer Olympics
Olympic equestrians of Brazil
Pan American Games medalists in equestrian
Pan American Games bronze medalists for Brazil
Equestrians at the 2011 Pan American Games
Equestrians at the 2019 Pan American Games
Medalists at the 2019 Pan American Games
21st-century Brazilian people
20th-century Brazilian people